Dato’ Sri Hajah Rohani binti Abdul Karim (Jawi: روحاني بنت عبدالكريم; born 3 January 1955) is a Malaysian politician who served as the Minister of Women, Family and Community Development, Deputy Minister of Domestic Trade, Cooperatives and Consumerism, Deputy Minister of Agriculture and Agro-based Industries in the Barisan Nasional (BN) administration under former Prime Ministers Abdullah Ahmad Badawi and Najib Razak and former Ministers Ismail Sabri Yaakob, Mustapa Mohamed and Noh Omar from March 2008 to the collapse of the BN administration in May 2018 as well as the Member of Parliament (MP) for Batang Lupar from March 2004 to November 2022 and for Santubong from October 1990 to March 2004. She is a member of the Parti Pesaka Bumiputera Bersatu (PBB), a component party of the Gabungan Parti Sarawak (GPS) and formerly BN coalitions.

Early life
She was born on 3 January 1955 in Simanggang (now known as Sri Aman), Sarawak. She received her early education at SMK Methodist, Sibu. She has continued her education at Universiti Pertanian Malaysia in the field of agro-industry. She then resumed her studies until she obtained her Master of Business Administration (MBA) from Ohio University, Athens, USA. She has three children.

Participation in politics

Become Member of Parliament and Cabinet Minister
In the 1990 general election, Rohani was elected as a candidate and won the Santubong parliamentary seat.

In the 1995 and 1999 general election, she was still able to defend the Santubong Parliamentary seat. In the 2004 general election, she had switched to the Batang Lupar, Sri Aman, Sarawak, where she was born, and won uncontested.

She once again won the Batang Lupar parliamentary seat against opposition party representatives in the 2008 general election with 70 percent of her vote in favour of her. Later she was appointed Deputy Minister of Agriculture and Agro-based Industry by the Malaysian Prime Minister Tun Abdullah Ahmad Badawi.

On April 9, 2009, Malaysia's sixth Prime Minister, Datuk Seri Najib Razak, who just held the leadership of the country at that time, entrusted her to take over Tan Lian Hoe's duties as Deputy Minister of Domestic Trade, Co-operatives and Consumerism.

On May 15, 2013, she was appointed Women and Family Development Minister in the Ministry of Women, Family and Community Development. She started her official duties as Minister on 17 May 2013.

Batang Lupar Member of Parliament
She is well-known for her outgoing personality in her constituency Batang Lupar. Her role as Deputy Minister meant most of her time was spent in Malaya. However, it did not stop her from going to the ground and meet with her constituents. Rohani is also IT-savvy, as evidenced by her frequent updates on her Twitter and Facebook pages.

Election results

Honours
  :
  Grand Knight of the Order of Sultan Ahmad Shah of Pahang (SSAP) - Dato’ Sri (2013)
  :
  Knight Commander of the Order of the Star of Sarawak (PNBS) - Dato Sri (2017)

References

Living people
1955 births
People from Sarawak
Women members of the Dewan Rakyat
Women in Sarawak politics
Malaysian Muslims
Knights Commander of the Most Exalted Order of the Star of Sarawak
Members of the Dewan Rakyat
Parti Pesaka Bumiputera Bersatu politicians
Government ministers of Malaysia
Ohio University alumni
Women government ministers of Malaysia
21st-century Malaysian women politicians